Villiers Island is a  area in Toronto's Port Lands being converted to an island. The project is a part of Port Lands Flood Protection Project by Waterfront Toronto. To prevent flooding from the Don River, a channel is being created to extend the river south and then west into Toronto Harbour  providing another outlet and a more natural mouth for the Don River. The new channel effectively creates the island, which is also bounded by the Keating Channel and Toronto Harbour. Mixed-use residential development is planned for Villiers Island.

Villiers Sankey
The new island and Villiers Street are named for Major Villiers Sankey (1854–1905), a British Army officer and the city's early surveyor (1888-1905). Sankey was born in Ireland and came to Canada sometime after he passed his India Civil Service exams in 1872.

Project
A full build-out of Villiers Island will feature:
 a re-routed Cherry Street connected to Lake Shore Boulevard by a pair of new bridges
 a naturalized river valley as a new route for the Don River flowing south then west along the southern side of the island
 a river park on south side of the new island
 a promontory park on the west side of the island, with the Western Dock retaining wall conserved
 Villiers Park on the east of the island, along the new route of the Don River
 a promenade on the north side along Keating Channel

Plans for the new island show a greenbelt, and parkland, surrounding a developed central area. The developed central area will be primarily residential. A new "naturalized" channel for the Don River will be created, while the existing Keating Channel will be preserved.

The new channel will have natural curves, and will have more natural banks, with natural plants that could provide habitat for migrating birds and wildlife.  The channel will empty into Toronto Harbour at what is now the Polson slip. The Keating Channel had mooring for multiple freighters. Plans for Villiers Island included adding more natural looking curves on the Keating Channel's southern bank.

The island lies on former industrial land, first created through landfill. The area will be cleared but buildings considered to have heritage value will be preserved.  These will either be moved to higher ground, or left in declivities, when additional landfill will be used to raise the ground level two metres in the event of rare extraordinary flooding.  More recent structures will be demolished. Some existing industrial uses have been moved to the main shipping channel to the south.

Just south of Lake Shore Boulevard, Cherry Street will be relocated slightly to the west with new bridges crossing the Keating Channel. The Don Greenway, a new river valley, is being constructed south from the Don River, crossing Commissioners Street under a new bridge, before turning west into Toronto Harbour. This new channel will allow high water from the Don River to flow move easily south by avoiding the 90-degree turn into the Keating Channel.

Bridges

There will be four new bridges providing three access points to the future Villiers Island. All three locations will have provision for future streetcar service, which may be a future expansion of the proposed East Bayfront LRT. All four bridges will have the same esthetic design and each span will have a curved steel dome (designed by CIG Architecture of the Netherlands) rising over the road surface. The builder expects the last of the four bridges to be shipped in 2022. All bridge spans are pre-assembled in Dartmouth and shipped on a barge via the Saint Lawrence Seaway.

The four bridges are as follows:
 The Cherry Street North bridges are two single-span, side-by-side bridges that will replace the Cherry Street lift bridge. One bridge will be for road traffic while the other will be used by pedestrians and public transit vehicles. The transit bridge could initially carry buses but was designed for streetcars. In early November 2020, the transit bridge was constructed and was brought to Toronto by barge.
 The Cherry Street South bridge will have three spans crossing a newly created channel to run south of and roughly parallel to Commissioners Street. The Cherry Street Strauss Trunnion Bascule Bridge lies further south on Cherry Street off the island.
 The Commissioners Street bridge will have four spans and will be placed over a man-made channel being built as a southward extension of the Don River. Because of Seaway limitations, the bridge will be shipped in two sections to be joined on site.

There will be a provision for three additional bridges in the future:
 a second Commissioners Street bridge,
 a second Cherry Street South bridge, and
 a four span bridge at Lake Shore Boulevard.

Flood control
Villiers Island is a product of Waterfront Toronto's Port Lands Flood Protection Project. , water from the Don River make a 90-degree turn into the Keating Channel, creating a bottleneck for water and a risk of flooding. To eliminate this bottleneck, a new channel will be dug to extend the Don River south from the east end of the Keating Channel, and then west between Commissioners Street and the Ship Channel. The new channel will be in a man-made naturalized river valley that will end at the north side of Polson Slip, the location of the new mouth of the Don River. The new Don River channel will effectively create Villiers Island.

Just north of the Keating Channel, the existing Don River channel will be widened to eliminate a bottleneck causing flooding; this requires the lengthening of the bridge carrying Lake Shore Boulevard over the Don river. Weirs will be built south of the bridge to direct the waters of the Don River away from the Keating Channel and into the new southbound channel. After the weirs are installed, lake water would normally fill the Keating Channel. However, if the new channel cannot handle the water flow, Don River water could be diverted into the Keating Channel. The walls of the Keating Channel will be reinforced, and a wildlife habitat will be provided.

The new channel will be the primary outlet for the Don River; the Keating Channel will be a secondary outlet if the need arises. There will also be a third outlet to be called the Don Greenway, to be located south-east of Villiers Island. This will be a spillway and wetland situated between where the new Don River channel bends from south to west and the Ship Channel. Normally, water in the Don Greenway will only come from the Ship Channel. However, if the new Don River channel cannot handle high water volumes, then that water would be allowed to flood the Don Greenway and flow into the Ship Channel.

History

The island was first part of the "Ashbridge's Bay" wetlands around the original mouth of the Don River, connected to a sandbar that is now the Toronto Islands. By the turn of the 20th century, the marsh had become polluted, and the city filled it with landfill, and devoted it to industrial purposes. Some of the early twentieth century landfill was polluted, contaminated with heavy metals or toxic chemicals. The industrial enterprises were also polluting, including acres of petroleum tank farms and berms of road salt.

This right-hand turn caused a significant build-up of silt and debris that had to be removed by the port authorities regularly to minimize flooding of the surrounding area after a storm.

By 2000, the area around the mouth of the Don River had declined in usage and significant areas were vacant. These lands were not developable due to the cost of remediating the polluted lands, and the lack of flood protection. To "unlock" the area for development, Waterfront Toronto proposed to "naturalize" the mouth of the Don River. In conjunction with this, berms were built at Corktown Commons. The area between the Keating Channel and the new naturalized mouth would become Villiers Island, to be redeveloped for a mix of residential and open space uses.

In October 2017, the Port Lands Planning Framework and Villiers Island Precinct Plan were adopted by Toronto City Council. The Port Lands Flood Protection project is being funded by all three orders of government. The design for Port Lands Flood Protection was established through an Environmental Assessment, approved in 2015. The Villiers Island Precinct Plan establishes design and development objectives for the area. The plan was developed by Urban Strategies Inc. of Toronto, with support from Arup and other firms, with the City of Toronto and Waterfront Toronto.

In March 2020, lakefilling work was completed at the north-west tip of the future Villiers Island. The work would strengthen the dock walls at Essroc Quay to prevent their collapse during water surges.

Preserved buildings

References

External links

 Project map for Villiers Island

Islands of Lake Ontario in Ontario
Waterfront Toronto